Mohammad Hossein Babagoli is an Iranian football winger who plays for Nassaji in the Persian Gulf Pro League.

Club career

Rah Ahan
Babagoli joined Rah Ahan in summer 2015 under contract until 2020. He made his professional debut for Rah Ahan on September 16, 2015 in 1-0 loss against Malavan as a substitute for Mehdi Jafarpour.

Club career statistics

References

External links
 Mohammad Hossein Babagoli at IranLeague.ir

1997 births
Living people
Iranian footballers
People from Babol
Rah Ahan players
Association football wingers
Nassaji Mazandaran players
Sportspeople from Mazandaran province